In mathematics, the complexification or universal complexification of a real Lie group is given by a continuous homomorphism of the group into a complex Lie group with the universal property that every continuous homomorphism of the original group into another complex Lie group extends compatibly to a complex analytic homomorphism between the complex Lie groups. The complexification, which always exists, is unique up to unique isomorphism. Its Lie algebra is a quotient of the complexification of the Lie algebra of the original group. They are isomorphic if the original group has a quotient by a discrete normal subgroup which is linear.

For compact Lie groups, the complexification, sometimes called the Chevalley complexification after Claude Chevalley, can be defined as the group of complex characters of the Hopf algebra of representative functions, i.e. the matrix coefficients of finite-dimensional representations of the group. In any finite-dimensional faithful unitary representation of the compact group it can be realized concretely as a closed subgroup of the complex general linear group. In this case the complexification is a complex algebraic group and its Lie algebra is the complexification of the Lie algebra of the compact Lie group.

Universal complexification

Definition
If  is a Lie group, a universal complexification is given by a complex Lie group  and a continuous homomorphism  with the universal property that, if  is an arbitrary continuous homomorphism into a complex Lie group , then there is a unique complex analytic homomorphism  such that .

Universal complexifications always exist and are unique up to a unique complex analytic isomorphism (preserving inclusion of the original group).

Existence
If  is connected with Lie algebra , then its universal covering group  is simply connected. We have the inclusion , which follows from the fact that the kernel of the adjoint representation of  equals its centre, combined with the equality 

which holds for any . Denoting by  the smallest closed normal Lie subgroup of  that contains , we must now also have the inclusion .

In particular, if  is simply connected, its universal complexification is just . 

The map  is obtained by passing to the quotient.

For non-connected Lie groups  with identity component  and component group , the extension

induces an extension

Proof of the universal property
The map  indeed possesses the universal property which appears in the above definition of complexification. The proof of this statement naturally follows from considering the following instructive diagram.

Here,  is an arbitrary smooth homomorphism of Lie groups with a complex Lie group as the codomain.

For simplicity, we assume  is connected. Since  is simply connected, Lie's second fundamental theorem now provides us with a unique complex analytic morphism  between complex Lie groups, such that . To show well-definedness of this map (i.e. ), consider the derivative of the map . For any , we have

,

which (by simple connectedness of ) implies . Since  is a complex analytic surjective submersion, the map  is complex analytic since  is. The desired equality  is imminent.

But  is a submersion, so , thus connectedness of  implies .

Uniqueness
The universal property implies that the universal complexification is unique up to complex analytic isomorphism.

Injectivity

Basic examples
The following isomorphisms of complexifications of Lie groups with known Lie groups can be constructed directly from the general construction of the complexification.

 The complexification of the special unitary group of 2x2 matrices is 

.

This follows from the isomorphism of Lie algebras
,
together with the fact that  is simply connected.

 The complexification of the special linear group of 2x2 matrices is 

. 

This follows from the isomorphism of Lie algebras
,
together with the fact that  is simply connected.

 The complexification of the special orthogonal group of 3x3 matrices is 

,

where  denotes the proper orthochronous Lorentz group.
.

 The complexification of the proper orthochronous Lorentz group is 

. 

This follows from the same isomorphism of Lie algebras as in the second example, again using the universal (double) cover of the proper orthochronous Lorentz group.

 The complexification of the special orthogonal group of 4x4 matrices is

.

The last two examples show that Lie groups with isomorphic complexifications may not be isomorphic. Furthermore, the complexifications of Lie groups  and  show that complexification is not an idempotent operation, i.e.

Chevalley complexification

Hopf algebra of matrix coefficients
It is naturally a Hopf algebra with comultiplication given by

The homomorphisms of  into  also form a group.

Invariant theory
Let  be a closed subgroup of the unitary group  where  is a finite-dimensional complex inner product space. It is generated as a *-algebra by its unitary operators and its commutant is the *-algebra spanned by the operators . The defining relations (as a commutant) show that  is an algebraic subgroup. The extension is compatible with the polar decomposition.

Decompositions in the Chevalley complexification

Cartan decomposition
The decomposition derived from the polar decomposition

The exponential factor  is invariant under conjugation by  but is not a subgroup.

Gauss decomposition
The Gauss decomposition is a generalization of the LU decomposition for the general linear group and a specialization of the Bruhat decomposition. For  it states that with respect to a given orthonormal basis  an element  of  can be factorized in the form

In fact Gaussian elimination shows there is a unique  such that  is upper triangular.

Their Lie algebras consist of upper and lower strictly triangular matrices. The exponential mapping is a polynomial mapping from the Lie algebra to the corresponding subgroup by nilpotence. The inverse is given by the logarithm mapping which by unipotence is also a polynomial mapping. The exponential map is onto in each case, since the polynomial function   lies in a given Lie subalgebra if  and  do and are sufficiently small.

It is open and dense.

Bruhat decomposition

The dimension is maximized at the Coxeter element and gives the unique open dense double coset.

Let  be the Borel subgroup of upper triangular matrices and  the subgroup of diagonal matrices. So . Because a multiple of one row can be added to another, each row has a different number of zeros in it. For uniqueness, if , then the entries of  vanish below the diagonal.

 showed that the expression of an element  as  becomes unique if  is restricted to lie in the upper unitriangular subgroup . In fact, if , this follows from the identity

The group  has a natural filtration by normal subgroups  with zeros in the first  superdiagonals and the successive quotients are Abelian.

For , let  be the  matrix with 's on the antidiagonal and 's elsewhere and set

Then  is the fixed point subgroup of the involution . It leaves the subgroups  and  invariant.

Iwasawa decomposition
The Iwasawa decomposition

It is the semidirect product of the nilpotent subgroup  by the Abelian subgroup .

For  and its complexification , this decomposition can be derived as a restatement of the Gram–Schmidt orthonormalization process.

So  because  is connected.

 gives a method for explicitly computing the elements in the decomposition. For  in  set . This is a positive self-adjoint operator so its principal minors do not vanish. By the Gauss decomposition, it can therefore be written uniquely in the form
Since  is self-adjoint, uniqueness forces .

Complex structures on homogeneous spaces
It states that each irreducible representation

The closed connected subgroups of  containing  are described by Borel–de Siebenthal theory. They are exactly the centralizers of tori .

Since  is annihilated by every raising operator corresponding to a positive root ,  contains the Borel subgroup .

By the Iwasawa decomposition .

In particular

The group  is also connected. In fact the space  is simply connected,
The homogeneous space  has a complex structure, because  is a complex subgroup. The orbit in complex projective space is closed in the Zariski topology by Chow's theorem, so is a smooth projective variety.

The parabolic subgroup  can also be written as a union of double cosets of 

Noncompact real forms
There are other closed subgroups of the complexification of a compact connected Lie group G which have the same complexified Lie algebra. These are the other real forms of GC.

Involutions of simply connected compact Lie groups
If G is a simply connected compact Lie group and σ is an automorphism of order 2, then the fixed point subgroup K = Gσ is automatically connected. (In fact this is true for any automorphism of G, as shown for inner automorphisms by Steinberg and in general by Borel.) 

This can be seen most directly when the involution σ corresponds to a Hermitian symmetric space. In that case σ is inner and implemented by an element in a one-parameter subgroup  exp tT contained in the center of Gσ. The innerness of σ implies that K contains a maximal torus of G, so has maximal rank. On the other hand, the centralizer of the subgroup generated by the torus S of elements exp tT is connected, since if x is any element in K there is a maximal torus containing x and S,  which lies in the centralizer. On the other hand, it contains K since S is central in K and is contained in K since z lies in S. So K is the centralizer of S and hence connected. In particular K contains the center of G.

For a general involution σ, the connectedness of Gσ can be seen as follows.

The starting point is the Abelian version of the result: if T is a maximal torus of a simply connected group G and σ is an involution leaving invariant T and a choice of positive roots (or equivalently a Weyl chamber), then the fixed point subgroup Tσ is connected. In fact the kernel of the exponential map from  onto T is a lattice Λ with a Z-basis indexed by simple roots, which σ permutes. Splitting up according to orbits, T can be written as a product of terms T on which σ acts trivially or terms T2 where σ interchanges the factors. The fixed point subgroup just corresponds to taking the diagonal subgroups in the second case, so is connected.

Now let x be any element fixed by σ, let S be a maximal torus in CG(x)σ and let T be the identity component of CG(x, S). Then T is a maximal torus in G containing x and S. It is invariant under σ and the identity component of Tσ is S. In fact since x and S commute, they are contained in a maximal torus which, because it is connected, must lie in T. By construction T is invariant under σ. The identity component of Tσ contains  S, lies in CG(x)σ and centralizes S, so it equals S. But S is central in T, to T must be Abelian and hence a maximal torus. For σ acts as multiplication by −1 on the Lie algebra , so it and therefore also  are Abelian.

The proof is completed by showing that σ preserves a Weyl chamber associated with T. For then Tσ is connected so must equal S. Hence x lies in S.  Since x was arbitrary, Gσ must therefore be connected.

To produce a Weyl chamber invariant under σ, note that there is no root space  on which both x and S acted trivially, for this would contradict the fact that CG(x, S) has the same Lie algebra as T. Hence there must be an element s in S such that t = xs acts non-trivially on each root space. In this case t is a regular element of T—the identity component of its centralizer in G equals T. There is a unique Weyl alcove A in  such that t lies in exp A and 0 lies in the closure of A. Since t is fixed by σ, the alcove is left invariant by σ and hence so also is the Weyl chamber C containing it.

Conjugations on the complexification
Let G be a simply connected compact Lie group with complexification GC. The map c(g) = (g*)−1 defines an automorphism of GC as a real Lie group with G as fixed point subgroup.
Since GC is also simply connected any conjugation c1 on  corresponds to a unique automorphism c1 of GC.

The classification of conjugations c0 reduces to that of involutions σ of G because
given a c1 there is an automorphism φ of the complex group GC such that

commutes with c. The conjugation c0 then leaves G invariant and restricts to an involutive automorphism σ. By simple connectivity the same is true at the level of Lie algebras. At the Lie algebra level c0 can be recovered from σ by the formula

To prove the existence of φ let ψ = c1c an automorphism of the complex group GC. On the Lie algebra level it defines a self-adjoint operator for the complex inner product

Thus ψ2 is a positive operator and an automorphism along with all its real powers. In particular take

It satisfies

Cartan decomposition in a real form
For the complexification GC, the Cartan decomposition is described above. Derived from the polar decomposition in the complex general linear group, it gives a diffeomorphism

On GC there is a conjugation operator c corresponding to G as well as an involution σ commuting with c. Let c0 = c σ and let G0 be the fixed point subgroup of c. It is closed in the matrix group GC and therefore a Lie group. The involution σ acts on both G and G0. For the Lie algebra of G there is a decomposition

into the +1 and −1 eigenspaces of σ. The fixed point subgroup K of σ in G is connected since G is simply connected. Its Lie algebra is the +1 eigenspace . The Lie algebra of G0 is given by

and the fixed point subgroup of σ is again K, so that G ∩ G0 = K. In G0, there is a Cartan decomposition

which is again a diffeomorphism onto the direct and corresponds to the polar decomposition of matrices.
It is the restriction of the decomposition on GC. The product gives a diffeomorphism onto a closed subset of G0. To check that it is surjective, for g in G0 write g = u ⋅ p with u in G and p in P. Since c0 g = g, uniqueness implies that σu = u and σp = p−1. Hence u lies in K and p in P0.

The Cartan decomposition in G0 shows that G0 is connected, simply connected and noncompact, because of the direct factor P0. Thus G0 is a noncompact real semisimple Lie group.

The properties of A can be shown directly. In the K-orbit of any element of  there is an element Y such that (X,Ad k Y) is minimized at k = 1.

Morevoer, from the Cartan decomposition for G0,  if A0 = exp , then

Iwasawa decomposition in a real form

See also
Real form (Lie theory)

Notes

References

 

Lie groups
Lie algebras
Algebraic groups
Representation theory